USCGC Vigilant (WPC-154) was an  of the United States Coast Guard. She was 125-foot, steel-hulled, twin-screw, diesel-powered cutter primarily outfitted for Aids to Navigation work. On the night of 24 January 1931, she was involved in the chase and capture of Canadian rum-running schooner Josephine K, which was captured off of New York Harbor with a cargo of whisky valued at $100,000 confiscated. The crew was exonerated on 31 January of blame by a Coast Guard board of inquiry in the death of the captain of the Josephine K, who was mortally wounded by a one-pound shot during the chase.

WPC-154 was involved in the rescue of survivors of several U-boat attacks off central Florida in the 1940s.

References

Bibliography

External links
 Vigilant IV
 Vigilant 1927

Ships of the United States Coast Guard
1927 ships
Active-class patrol boats
Ships built in Camden, New Jersey
Brown, Boveri & Cie